David Fairly McInnis (born August 5, 1934) was an American politician in the state of South Carolina. He served in the South Carolina House of Representatives from 1975 to 1982, representing Sumter County, South Carolina. He is a lawyer and judge. He served on the South Carolina Circuit Court as a judge on the third circuit.

References

1934 births
Living people
People from Sumter County, South Carolina
Members of the South Carolina House of Representatives
South Carolina state court judges
South Carolina lawyers
People from Timmonsville, South Carolina